= Journal of Analytical Chemistry =

Scientific journal on analytical chemistry

- Discipline: Analytical chemistry
- Language: English
- Edited by: Vladimir P. Kolotov

Publication details
- Former name: Journal of Analytical Chemistry of the USSR (1945–1991)
- History: 1945-present
- Publisher: Springer, Pleiades Publishing
- Frequency: 14/year
- Impact factor: 1.1 (2024)

Standard abbreviations
- ISO 4: J. Anal. Chem.

Indexing
- CODEN: JACTE2
- ISSN: 1061-9348 (print); 1608-3199 (web)

Links
- Journal homepage; Online access; Online archive

Journal of Analytical Chemistry is a peer-reviewed scientific journal published by Springer Science+Business Media and Pleiades Publishing. Established in 1945 under the name Journal of Analytical Chemistry of the USSR, it was retitled as Journal of Analytical Chemistry in 1991. It covers theoretical and applied aspects of analytical chemistry. Its current editor-in-chief is Vladimir P. Kolotov (Russian Academy of Sciences).

== Abstracting and indexing ==
The journal is abstracted and indexed in:

- Chemical Abstracts Core
- Current Contents/Physical, Chemical & Earth Sciences
- EBSCO databases
- Ei Compendex
- Inspec
- ProQuest databases
- Science Citation Index Expanded
- Scopus

According to the Journal Citation Reports, the journal has a 2024 impact factor of 1.1.
